The New Diorama Theatre is an eighty-seat theatre near Regent's Park in the London Borough of Camden, opened in 2010. The theatre received two Peter Brook awards during the first two years of its programming. Its artistic director is the playwright David Byrne.

History

New Diorama Theatre opened in 2010 in the new British Land development of Regents Place as part of a Section 106 Agreement. As such, it has a responsibility to serve local workers and residents.

Awards

New Diorama Theatre received two consecutive Peter Brook awards for the first two years of its programming. In 2014 its Artistic Director, David Byrne, won Best Artistic Director at the OffWestEnd Awards.

References

Theatres in the London Borough of Camden